The 1993–94 NBA season was the Nuggets' 18th season in the National Basketball Association, and 27th season as a franchise. The Nuggets had the ninth pick in the 1993 NBA draft, and selected Rodney Rogers out of Wake Forest University. During the off-season, the team acquired Brian Williams from the Orlando Magic, then during the first month of the regular season, they traded Mark Macon and Marcus Liberty to the Detroit Pistons in exchange for All-Star guard Alvin Robertson. However, Robertson never played for the Nuggets due to a back injury, and was out for the entire season. The Nuggets played around .500 all season long with a 22–25 record at the All-Star break, and finished fourth in the Midwest Division with a 42–40 record and made the playoffs for the first time in 4 years. The Nuggets qualified for the playoffs as the #8 seed in the Western Conference.

Last season's Most Improved Player Mahmoud Abdul-Rauf led the team in scoring with 18.0 points per game, while second-year star LaPhonso Ellis averaged 15.4 points and 8.6 rebounds per game, and Dikembe Mutombo averaged 12.0 points, 11.8 rebounds and 4.1 blocks per game. In addition, Reggie Williams provided the team with 13.0 points and 1.4 steals per game, while second-year guard Bryant Stith contributed 12.5 points and 1.4 steals per game, and sixth man Robert Pack provided with 9.6 points and 5.4 assists per game off the bench. Mutombo also finished in third place in Defensive Player of the Year voting.

The Western Conference First Round saw the Nuggets matched up with the Seattle SuperSonics. The Sonics had posted a league best 63–19 record, as the Nuggets lost the first two games of the series. Upon arriving in Denver, the Nuggets used the shot blocking presence of Mutombo to match up with the Sonics. Along with career performances by Pack, Reggie Williams and Brian Williams, the Nuggets evened the series. The series went back to Seattle for the 5th game. The Nuggets rallied to tie the game and force overtime. The Nuggets would emerge with a 4-point victory by the score of 98–94, and became the first 8th-seeded team to beat a #1 seed. An on-court camera featured Mutombo, in jubilation on his back holding the ball after the buzzer.

In the Western Conference Semi-finals, the Nuggets dropped their first 3 games to the 5th-seeded Utah Jazz. Despite the threat of elimination, the Nuggets would rally to win the next 3 games and force a game seven. The postseason run would end as they lost 91–81. Following the season, Robertson was released to free agency.

For the season, the Nuggets revealed a new primary logo of a snowcapped mountain over the team name in gold, and changed their uniforms adding dark navy blue, gold and dark red to their color scheme. The new logo and uniforms both remained in use until 2003, while the basic design of the logo lasted until 2018.

Draft picks

Roster

Roster Notes
 Shooting guard Alvin Robertson missed the entire season due to a back injury, and never played for the Nuggets.

Regular season

Season standings

z – clinched division title
y – clinched division title
x – clinched playoff spot

Record vs. opponents

Game log

Regular season

|- align="center" bgcolor="#ffcccc"
| 1
| November 5, 1993
| @ Sacramento
| L 100–109
|
|
|
| ARCO Arena
| 0–1
|- align="center" bgcolor="#ccffcc"
| 2
| November 7, 1993
| L.A. Clippers
| W 99–97
|
|
|
| McNichols Sports Arena
| 1–1
|- align="center" bgcolor="#ffcccc"
| 3
| November 9, 1993
| @ Seattle
| L 86–118
|
|
|
| Seattle Center Coliseum
| 1–2
|- align="center" bgcolor="#ccffcc"
| 4
| November 12, 1993
| @ L.A. Lakers
| W 113–84
|
|
|
| Great Western Forum
| 2–2
|- align="center" bgcolor="#ffcccc"
| 5
| November 13, 1993
| Golden State
| L 98–106
|
|
|
| McNichols Sports Arena
| 2–3
|- align="center" bgcolor="#ffcccc"
| 6
| November 16, 1993
| San Antonio
| L 74–86
|
|
|
| McNichols Sports Arena
| 2–4
|- align="center" bgcolor="#ccffcc"
| 7
| November 18, 1993
| Cleveland
| W 100–93
|
|
|
| McNichols Sports Arena
| 3–4
|- align="center" bgcolor="#ccffcc"
| 8
| November 20, 1993
| @ Minnesota
| W 90–89
|
|
|
| Target Center
| 4–4
|- align="center" bgcolor="#ffcccc"
| 9
| November 23, 1993
| @ Portland
| L 94–109
|
|
|
| Memorial Coliseum
| 4–5
|- align="center" bgcolor="#ffcccc"
| 10
| November 24, 1993
| @ Phoenix
| L 97–130
|
|
|
| America West Arena
| 4–6
|- align="center" bgcolor="#ccffcc"
| 11
| November 26, 1993
| Portland
| W 112–101
|
|
|
| McNichols Sports Arena
| 5–6
|- align="center" bgcolor="#ccffcc"
| 12
| November 27, 1993
| New Jersey
| W 111–89
|
|
|
| McNichols Sports Arena
| 6–6
|- align="center" bgcolor="#ffcccc"
| 13
| November 30, 1993
| @ Utah
| L 92–103
|
|
|
| Delta Center
| 6–7

|- align="center" bgcolor="#ccffcc"
| 14
| December 3, 1993
| Charlotte
| W 102–94
|
|
|
| McNichols Sports Arena
| 7–7
|- align="center" bgcolor="#ccffcc"
| 15
| December 5, 1993
| Dallas
| W 115–110
|
|
|
| McNichols Sports Arena
| 8–7
|- align="center" bgcolor="#ffcccc"
| 16
| December 7, 1993
| @ Golden State
| L 90–95
|
|
|
| Oakland-Alameda County Coliseum Arena
| 8–8
|- align="center" bgcolor="#ccffcc"
| 17
| December 10, 1993
| Utah
| W 107–98
|
|
|
| McNichols Sports Arena
| 9–8
|- align="center" bgcolor="#ffcccc"
| 18
| December 11, 1993
| @ San Antonio
| L 100–105
|
|
|
| Alamodome
| 9–9
|- align="center" bgcolor="#ffcccc"
| 19
| December 14, 1993
| @ New York
| L 84–93
|
|
|
| Madison Square Garden
| 9–10
|- align="center" bgcolor="#ffcccc"
| 20
| December 15, 1993
| @ Philadelphia
| L 93–101
|
|
|
| The Spectrum
| 9–11
|- align="center" bgcolor="#ffcccc"
| 21
| December 17, 1993
| @ Charlotte
| L 96–99
|
|
|
| Charlotte Coliseum
| 9–12
|- align="center" bgcolor="#ffcccc"
| 22
| December 18, 1993
| @ Atlanta
| L 96–102
|
|
|
| The Omni
| 9–13
|- align="center" bgcolor="#ccffcc"
| 23
| December 21, 1993
| Phoenix
| W 121–95
|
|
|
| McNichols Sports Arena
| 10–13
|- align="center" bgcolor="#ccffcc"
| 24
| December 23, 1993
| @ Houston
| W 106–93
|
|
|
| The Summit
| 11–13
|- align="center" bgcolor="#ccffcc"
| 25
| December 26, 1993
| Minnesota
| W 100–97
|
|
|
| McNichols Sports Arena
| 12–13
|- align="center" bgcolor="#ccffcc"
| 26
| December 28, 1993
| @ Dallas
| W 97–85
|
|
|
| Reunion Arena
| 13–13
|- align="center" bgcolor="#ccffcc"
| 27
| December 30, 1993
| Golden State
| W 101–96
|
|
|
| McNichols Sports Arena
| 14–13

|- align="center" bgcolor="#ffcccc"
| 28
| January 2, 1994
| Philadelphia
| L 80–96
|
|
|
| McNichols Sports Arena
| 14–14
|- align="center" bgcolor="#ffcccc"
| 29
| January 4, 1994
| L.A. Lakers
| L 118–119
|
|
|
| McNichols Sports Arena
| 14–15
|- align="center" bgcolor="#ffcccc"
| 30
| January 5, 1994
| @ Minnesota
| L 95–109
|
|
|
| Target Center
| 14–16
|- align="center" bgcolor="#ffcccc"
| 31
| January 7, 1994
| San Antonio
| L 76–84
|
|
|
| McNichols Sports Arena
| 14–17
|- align="center" bgcolor="#ccffcc"
| 32
| January 8, 1994
| Sacramento
| W 104–98
|
|
|
| McNichols Sports Arena
| 15–17
|- align="center" bgcolor="#ccffcc"
| 33
| January 11, 1994
| @ Detroit
| W 94–86
|
|
|
| The Palace of Auburn Hills
| 16–17
|- align="center" bgcolor="#ffcccc"
| 34
| January 12, 1994
| @ Indiana
| L 96–107
|
|
|
| Market Square Arena
| 16–18
|- align="center" bgcolor="#ffcccc"
| 35
| January 14, 1994
| @ New Jersey
| L 96–103
|
|
|
| Brendan Byrne Arena
| 16–19
|- align="center" bgcolor="#ffcccc"
| 36
| January 16, 1994
| @ Boston
| L 100–105
|
|
|
| Boston Garden
| 16–20
|- align="center" bgcolor="#ffcccc"
| 37
| January 18, 1994
| Portland
| L 103–104 (OT)
|
|
|
| McNichols Sports Arena
| 17–20
|- align="center" bgcolor="#ccffcc"
| 38
| January 20, 1994
| Houston
| W 111–106 (2OT)
|
|
|
| McNichols Sports Arena
| 17–21
|- align="center" bgcolor="#ccffcc"
| 39
| January 22, 1994
| Seattle
| W 98–91
|
|
|
| McNichols Sports Arena
| 18–21
|- align="center" bgcolor="#ccffcc"
| 40
| January 27, 1994
| Indiana
| W 113–106
|
|
|
| McNichols Sports Arena
| 19–21
|- align="center" bgcolor="#ccffcc"
| 41
| January 29, 1994
| Detroit
| W 129–110
|
|
|
| McNichols Sports Arena
| 20–21

|- align="center" bgcolor="#ffcccc"
| 42
| February 1, 1994
| Chicago
| L 98–118
|
|
|
| McNichols Sports Arena
| 20–22
|- align="center" bgcolor="#ffcccc"
| 43
| February 2, 1994
| @ Golden State
| L 84–97
|
|
|
| Oakland-Alameda County Coliseum Arena
| 20–23
|- align="center" bgcolor="#ccffcc"
| 44
| February 4, 1994
| @ Sacramento
| W 108–83
|
|
|
| ARCO Arena
| 21–23
|- align="center" bgcolor="#ccffcc"
| 45
| February 6, 1994
| Dallas
| W 99–89
|
|
|
| McNichols Sports Arena
| 22–23
|- align="center" bgcolor="#ffcccc"
| 46
| February 8, 1994
| Utah
| L 95–96
|
|
|
| McNichols Sports Arena
| 22–24
|- align="center" bgcolor="#ffcccc"
| 47
| February 10, 1994
| @ San Antonio
| L 87–94
|
|
|
| Alamodome
| 22–25
|- align="center"
|colspan="9" bgcolor="#bbcaff"|All-Star Break
|- style="background:#cfc;"
|- bgcolor="#bbffbb"
|- align="center" bgcolor="#ffcccc"
| 48
| February 15, 1994
| @ Cleveland
| L 99–111
|
|
|
| Richfield Coliseum
| 22–26
|- align="center" bgcolor="#ccffcc"
| 49
| February 16, 1994
| @ Milwaukee
| W 107–95
|
|
|
| Bradley Center
| 23–26
|- align="center" bgcolor="#ccffcc"
| 50
| February 18, 1994
| @ Chicago
| W 109–84
|
|
|
| Chicago Stadium
| 24–26
|- align="center" bgcolor="#ccffcc"
| 51
| February 20, 1994
| Atlanta
| W 97–92
|
|
|
| McNichols Sports Arena
| 25–26
|- align="center" bgcolor="#ffcccc"
| 52
| February 22, 1994
| @ Houston
| L 97–98
|
|
|
| The Summit
| 25–27
|- align="center" bgcolor="#ccffcc"
| 53
| February 23, 1994
| Boston
| W 102–94
|
|
|
| McNichols Sports Arena
| 26–27
|- align="center" bgcolor="#ccffcc"
| 54
| February 25, 1994
| New York
| W 102–94
|
|
|
| McNichols Sports Arena
| 27–27
|- align="center" bgcolor="#ffcccc"
| 55
| February 27, 1994
| @ Portland
| L 97–104
|
|
|
| Memorial Coliseum
| 27–28

|- align="center" bgcolor="#ccffcc"
| 56
| March 4, 1994
| Orlando
| W 98–89
|
|
|
| McNichols Sports Arena
| 28–28
|- align="center" bgcolor="#ccffcc"
| 57
| March 6, 1994
| Minnesota
| W 117–97
|
|
|
| McNichols Sports Arena
| 29–28
|- align="center" bgcolor="#ffcccc"
| 58
| March 8, 1994
| @ Orlando
| L 88–95
|
|
|
| Orlando Arena
| 29–29
|- align="center" bgcolor="#ffcccc"
| 59
| March 9, 1994
| @ Miami
| L 80–102
|
|
|
| Miami Arena
| 29–30
|- align="center" bgcolor="#ffcccc"
| 60
| March 11, 1994
| @ Washington
| L 93–100
|
|
|
| USAir Arena
| 29–31
|- align="center" bgcolor="#ccffcc"
| 61
| March 14, 1994
| San Antonio
| W 116–88
|
|
|
| McNichols Sports Arena
| 30–31
|- align="center" bgcolor="#ccffcc"
| 62
| March 17, 1994
| @ L.A. Clippers
| W 102–99
|
|
|
| Los Angeles Memorial Sports Arena
| 31–31
|- align="center" bgcolor="#ffcccc"
| 63
| March 18, 1994
| Sacramento
| L 103–115
|
|
|
| McNichols Sports Arena
| 31–32
|- align="center" bgcolor="#ccffcc"
| 64
| March 20, 1994
| Washington
| W 132–99
|
|
|
| McNichols Sports Arena
| 32–32
|- align="center" bgcolor="#ccffcc"
| 65
| March 22, 1994
| Milwaukee
| W 108–94
|
|
|
| McNichols Sports Arena
| 33–32
|- align="center" bgcolor="#ccffcc"
| 66
| March 24, 1994
| Miami
| W 113–101
|
|
|
| McNichols Sports Arena
| 34–32
|- align="center" bgcolor="#ccffcc"
| 67
| March 26, 1994
| Dallas
| W 112–101
|
|
|
| McNichols Sports Arena
| 35–32
|- align="center" bgcolor="#ffcccc"
| 68
| March 28, 1994
| @ Seattle
| L 97–111
|
|
|
| Seattle Center Coliseum
| 35–33

|- align="center" bgcolor="#ffcccc"
| 69
| April 2, 1994
| @ Utah
| L 91–101
|
|
|
| Delta Center
| 35–34
|- align="center" bgcolor="#ffcccc"
| 70
| April 3, 1994
| @ Phoenix
| L 98–108
|
|
|
| America West Arena
| 35–35
|- align="center" bgcolor="#ffcccc"
| 71
| April 5, 1994
| L.A. Clippers
| L 91–92
|
|
|
| McNichols Sports Arena
| 35–36
|- align="center" bgcolor="#ccffcc"
| 72
| April 7, 1994
| Seattle
| W 104–90
|
|
|
| McNichols Sports Arena
| 36–36
|- align="center" bgcolor="#ccffcc"
| 73
| April 8, 1994
| @ L.A. Lakers
| W 112–99
|
|
|
| Great Western Forum
| 37–36
|- align="center" bgcolor="#ffcccc"
| 74
| April 10, 1994
| Houston
| L 92–93
|
|
|
| McNichols Sports Arena
| 37–37
|- align="center" bgcolor="#ffcccc"
| 75
| April 12, 1994
| Phoenix
| L 102–107
|
|
|
| McNichols Sports Arena
| 37–38
|- align="center" bgcolor="#ccffcc"
| 76
| April 13, 1994
| @ San Antonio
| W 83–78
|
|
|
| Alamodome
| 38–38
|- align="center" bgcolor="#ffcccc"
| 77
| April 15, 1994
| @ Dallas
| L 97–99
|
|
|
| Reunion Arena
| 38–39
|- align="center" bgcolor="#ccffcc"
| 78
| April 17, 1994
| @ Minnesota
| W 99–88
|
|
|
| Target Center
| 39–39
|- align="center" bgcolor="#ccffcc"
| 79
| April 19, 1994
| L.A. Lakers
| W 105–98
|
|
|
| McNichols Sports Arena
| 40–39
|- align="center" bgcolor="#ccffcc"
| 80
| April 20, 1994
| @ L.A. Clippers
| W 100–85
|
|
|
| Los Angeles Memorial Sports Arena
| 41–39
|- align="center" bgcolor="#ffcccc"
| 81
| April 22, 1994
| Utah
| L 106–113
|
|
|
| McNichols Sports Arena
| 41–40
|- align="center" bgcolor="#ccffcc"
| 82
| April 24, 1994
| @ Houston
| W 115–107
|
|
|
| The Summit
| 42–40

Playoffs

|- align="center" bgcolor="#ffcccc"
| 1
| April 28, 1994
| @ Seattle
| L 82–106
| Bison Dele (15)
| Dikembe Mutombo (9)
| Robert Pack (4)
| Seattle Center Coliseum14,813
| 0–1
|- align="center" bgcolor="#ffcccc"
| 2
| April 30, 1994
| @ Seattle
| L 87–97
| LaPhonso Ellis (18)
| Ellis, Dele (10)
| Dikembe Mutombo (5)
| Seattle Center Coliseum14,813
| 0–2
|- align="center" bgcolor="#ccffcc"
| 3
| May 2, 1994
| Seattle
| W 110–93
| Reggie Williams (31)
| Dikembe Mutombo (13)
| Reggie Williams (8)
| McNichols Sports Arena17,171
| 1–2
|- align="center" bgcolor="#ccffcc"
| 4
| May 5, 1994
| Seattle
| W 94–85 (OT)
| LaPhonso Ellis (27)
| LaPhonso Ellis (17)
| Reggie Williams (6)
| McNichols Sports Arena17,171
| 2–2
|- align="center" bgcolor="#ccffcc"
| 5
| May 7, 1994
| @ Seattle
| W 98–94 (OT)
| Robert Pack (23)
| Bison Dele (19)
| Reggie Williams (5)
| Seattle Center Coliseum14,813
| 3–2
|-

|- align="center" bgcolor="#ffcccc"
| 1
| May 10, 1994
| @ Utah
| L 91–100
| Dikembe Mutombo (20)
| LaPhonso Ellis (12)
| Mahmoud Abdul-Rauf (5)
| Delta Center19,911
| 0–1
|- align="center" bgcolor="#ffcccc"
| 2
| May 12, 1994
| @ Utah
| L 94–104
| Mahmoud Abdul-Rauf (23)
| Dikembe Mutombo (13)
| Robert Pack (6)
| Delta Center19,911
| 0–2
|- align="center" bgcolor="#ffcccc"
| 3
| May 14, 1994
| Utah
| L 109–111 (OT)
| LaPhonso Ellis (25)
| Dikembe Mutombo (13)
| Robert Pack (8)
| McNichols Sports Arena17,171
| 0–3
|- align="center" bgcolor="#ccffcc"
| 4
| May 15, 1994
| Utah
| W 83–82
| Reggie Williams (21)
| Dikembe Mutombo (11)
| Mahmoud Abdul-Rauf (6)
| McNichols Sports Arena17,171
| 1–3
|- align="center" bgcolor="#ccffcc"
| 5
| May 17, 1994
| @ Utah
| W 109–101 (2OT)
| Stith, Abdul-Rauf (22)
| LaPhonso Ellis (11)
| Robert Pack (7)
| Delta Center19,911
| 2–3
|- align="center" bgcolor="#ccffcc"
| 6
| May 19, 1994
| Utah
| W 94–91
| Dikembe Mutombo (23)
| Dikembe Mutombo (12)
| three players tied (2)
| McNichols Sports Arena17,171
| 3–3
|- align="center" bgcolor="#ffcccc"
| 7
| May 21, 1994
| @ Utah
| L 81–91
| Reggie Williams (17)
| Dikembe Mutombo (17)
| Robert Pack (3)
| Delta Center19,911
| 3–4
|-

Playoffs

West First Round

(1) Seattle SuperSonics vs. (8) Denver Nuggets: Nuggets win series 3-2
 Game 1 @ Seattle Center Coliseum, Seattle (April 28): Seattle 106, Denver 82
 Game 2 @ Seattle Center Coliseum, Seattle (April 30): Seattle 97, Denver 87
 Game 3 @ McNichols Sports Arena, Denver (May 2): Denver 110, Seattle 93
 Game 4 @ McNichols Sports Arena, Denver (May 5): Denver 94, Seattle 85 (OT)
 Game 5 @ Seattle Center Coliseum, Seattle (May 7): Denver 98, Seattle 94 (OT)

Last Playoff Meeting: 1988 Western Conference First Round (Denver won 3-2)

West Conference Semi-finals

(5) Utah Jazz vs. (8) Denver Nuggets: Jazz win series 4-3
 Game 1 @ Delta Center, Salt Lake City (May 10): Utah 100, Denver 91
 Game 2 @ Delta Center, Salt Lake City (May 12): Utah 104, Denver 94
 Game 3 @ McNichols Sports Arena, Denver (May 14): Utah 111, Denver 109 (OT)
 Game 4 @ McNichols Sports Arena, Denver (May 15): Denver 83, Utah 82
 Game 5 @ Delta Center, Salt Lake City (May 17): Denver 109, Utah 101 (2OT)
 Game 6 @ McNichols Sports Arena, Denver (May 19): Denver 94, Utah 91
 Game 7 @ Delta Center, Salt Lake City (May 21): Utah 91, Denver 81

Last Playoff Meeting: 1985 Western Conference Semi-finals (Denver won 4-1)

Player statistics

Regular season

Playoffs

Player Statistics Citation:

Transactions

References

 Nuggets on Basketball Reference

Denver Nuggets seasons
Denver Nuggets season
Denver Nuggets season
Denver Nug